Samir Toplak (born 23 April 1970) is a Croatian professional football manager and former player who is current manager of Croatian First Football League club Gorica.

Born in Varaždin, Toplak spent most of his playing and managerial career at his hometown club Varteks.

Playing career 
Toplak started his career with Varteks, in Varaždin, and spent the first ten seasons of his career there. After proving himself to be one of the best defenders in the top level Prva HNL, Toplak transferred to German Bundesliga club VfL Bochum. He spent four seasons in Germany, where the club floated between first and second division. Toplak returned to Varteks in the summer of 2002, for the last season of his top-level football career.

He played two friendly matches for Croatia in a 1994, against Slovakia and Israel.

Managerial career 
During his last two years as a player, Toplak had started working as a youth coach in the Varteks system. Upon retirement, he became a club director and became an assistant manager (2005–2007) with the senior team. In 2010, Toplak was hired as manager of the senior team, the same year that it changed its name to NK Varaždin. He led the relatively young team, consisting mainly of Varaždin's home grown players, to a successful 2011–12 UEFA Europa League campaign, beating FC Lusitanos and Iskra-Stal before they were stopped in the third qualifying round by Romanian powerhouse Dinamo București in a narrow two leg encounter. However, the success in UEFA play was soon overshadowed when the club went bankrupt and was demoted to the very bottom of the Croatian football league system.

In August 2011 Toplak took over another Prva HNL club, HNK Cibalia, from Vinkovci. In the 2011–12 Prva HNL season, Toplak led Cibalia to a top table position and the semi-finals of the Croatian Cup. However, due to disagreements with the club's executive board, Toplak chose to leave Vinkovci in July 2012.

In December 2012, Toplak was appointed as manager of HNK Gorica, a second-level Druga HNL side located in Velika Gorica. Gorica's first half of the 2012–13 Druga HNL season had been disastrous, and they finished the first half in the relegation zone. Toplak was hired to bring the club back to the top of the chart by the end of the season. After failing to move Gorica out of the relegation zone, Toplak resigned on 20 April 2013, six games before the end of the season (Gorica did avoid relegation when other teams dropped below them during those last six games).

After leaving Gorica, Toplak took over the managerial position for another Druga HNL side, NK Zelina. After a disastrous 2013–14 season, during which Zelina struggled on the bottom of the table, Toplak resigned in April 2014.

Toplak was soon hired by Druga HNL side Inter Zaprešić. Inter and Toplak's primary goal was to secure promotion to the Prva HNL, and this goal was accomplished by finishing as champion of the 2014–15 season. They played in the Prva HNL the following season, their only goal being to avoid relegation. However, they exceeded their target by finishing the season in the middle of the league chart. The club played in the Prva HNL through the next four seasons, but during the first half of the 2019–20 season, with the club in near the bottom (8th) of the league table, Toplak was sacked on 4 January 2020.

On 10 February 2020, just a few weeks after leaving Inter Zaprešić, Toplak was hired to manage Prva HNL side NK Varaždin (no relation to the long defunct Varteks/Varaždin club he previously worked with), which was at the bottom (10th) of the league table. Toplak was able to guide the team to an 8th-place finish, while Inter Zaprešić fell to last place and was relegated to Druga HNL for the 2020–21 season.

On 14 March 2021, he succeeded Jerko Leko as manager of Prva HNL side NK Lokomotiva.

Personal life
In 1994 Toplak married his girlfriend of two years, Vesna. Two years later, they had their first daughter, Lana, and three years after that, while living in Bochum, Germany, daughter Bianka was born. In 2004 Toplak settled down with his family in a small village outside of Varaždin.

Career statistics

Managerial statistics 

Managerial record by team and tenure

References

External links
 
 

1970 births
Living people
Sportspeople from Varaždin
Association football defenders
Croatian footballers
Croatia international footballers
NK Varaždin players
VfL Bochum players
Croatian Football League players
Bundesliga players
2. Bundesliga players
Croatian expatriate footballers
Expatriate footballers in Germany
Croatian expatriate sportspeople in Germany
Croatian football managers
NK Varaždin managers
HNK Cibalia managers
HNK Gorica managers
NK Inter Zaprešić managers
NK Lokomotiva Zagreb managers